The 1944 La Flèche Wallonne was the eighth edition of La Flèche Wallonne cycle race and was held on 24 May 1944. The race started in Mons and finished in Charleroi. The race was won by Marcel Kint.

General classification

References

1944 in road cycling
1944
1944 in Belgian sport